Anders Johnson (14 November 1890 – 7 July 1952) was a Swedish sport shooter who competed in the 1920 Summer Olympics. He won a silver medal in the team free pistol competition, and also took part in the individual free pistol event.

References

1890 births
1952 deaths
Swedish male sport shooters
ISSF pistol shooters
Olympic shooters of Sweden
Shooters at the 1920 Summer Olympics
Olympic silver medalists for Sweden
Olympic medalists in shooting
Medalists at the 1920 Summer Olympics
19th-century Swedish people
20th-century Swedish people